Pleiocarpa mutica is a plant in the family Apocynaceae.

Description
Its fragrant flowers feature a white corolla. Local medicinal uses include as a treatment for stomach-ache, kidney diseases, malaria, jaundice and as a laxative.

Distribution and habitat
Pleiocarpa mutica is native to an area of tropical Africa from Sierra Leone east to the Central African Republic. The species is found in a variety of habitats from sea-level to  altitude.

Phytochemistry 
The alkaloid kopsinine, which has in vitro anticholinergic activity, has been isolated from Pleiocarpa mutica.

References

mutica
Flora of Africa
Plants used in traditional African medicine
Plants described in 1876